Ames Creek is a small tributary of the South Santiam River in the U.S. state of Oregon. It begins near Chimney Rock in the foothills of the Cascade Range in Linn County. Ames Creek passes under U.S. Route 20 just before entering the river.

Covered bridge
Weddle Bridge, a covered bridge, spans the creek in Sankey Park in Sweet Home. The bridge originally spanned Thomas Creek elsewhere in Linn County but was rebuilt over Ames Creek in 1989.

See also
 List of rivers of Oregon

References

External links
 South Santiam Watershed Council

Rivers of Linn County, Oregon
Rivers of Oregon